Dolbina schnitzleri is a species of moth of the  family Sphingidae. It is known from Sulawesi.

References

Dolbina
Moths described in 1997